Marta Ryszarda Kubiak (born 21 September 1985 in Piła) is a Polish politician. She was elected to the Sejm (9th term) representing the constituency of Piła. She previously also served in the 8th term of the Sejm (2015–2019).

References

1985 births
Living people
People from Piła
Law and Justice politicians
Members of the Polish Sejm 2015–2019
Members of the Polish Sejm 2019–2023
Women members of the Sejm of the Republic of Poland
21st-century Polish women politicians